Jason O'Mara (born 6 August 1972) is an Irish actor. He has starred in American television series Terra Nova (2011), Vegas (2012–13), Agents of S.H.I.E.L.D. (2016–17) and The Man in the High Castle (2018–19). For his performance in The Siege of Jadotville (2016), he won an Irish Film & Television Award for Best Supporting Actor. 

O'Mara also provided the voice of Batman in the DC Animated Movie Universe (2013–20) and Zeus on the Netflix series Blood of Zeus (2020–present).

Career 
O'Mara performed with The Royal Shakespeare Company. His theatre work in London and Dublin included The Jew of Malta and Popcorn, and he was nominated for Best Supporting Actor in 2002 at the Irish Theatre Awards for his portrayal of John in Neil LaBute's Bash.

He appeared in Harold Pinter's The Homecoming in London and Dublin as well as Lincoln Center in New York. He had lead roles in other series, including The Agency, Band of Brothers, Monarch of the Glen, High Stakes, Playing the Field, The Bill, Berkeley Square, and Reach for the Moon.

He has starred as lead character Sam Tyler in the U.S. remake of the British series Life on Mars. He also played Jim Shannon, the lead role in the 2011 Fox TV series Terra Nova. He played Philip Marlowe in a 2007 pilot entitled Marlowe.

O’Mara also played the role of George Washington in the History Channel miniseries Sons of Liberty (2015).

In both 2005 and 2008, O'Mara guest-starred on TNT's The Closer, playing the memorable role of Bill Croelick ("Just plain Brenda!"), a charming and psychotic man with a fixation on fire.

O'Mara also guest-starred in the Criminal Minds season two episode "The Last Word" as a serial killer. O'Mara appeared in One for the Money as Joe Morelli. He also appeared on Vegas as Jack Lamb.

O'Mara was cast as Bruce Wayne / Batman for the DC Universe Animated Original Movies shared universe of animated DC films based on The New 52. He has played the role in Justice League: War and Son of Batman and has reprised his role for several more films in the line, including Justice League: Throne of Atlantis, Batman: Bad Blood and Batman: Hush.

O'Mara joined the cast of Marvel's Agents of S.H.I.E.L.D., where he portrayed Jeffrey Mace, the new director of S.H.I.E.L.D.
   
In October 2018, O'Mara joined the cast of The Man in the High Castle, where he portrays series regular Wyatt Price, a black market supplier of information to Juliana Crain about the comings and goings of alternate realities and their films.

In 2019, it was announced O'Mara would be starring in Netflix's Greek myth-influenced series Gods & Heroes, in which he would voice the god Zeus.

Personal life 
He married American actress Paige Turco in a Roman Catholic ceremony in Old Saybrook, Connecticut in September 2003. They have one child. In 2009, O'Mara became an American citizen. The couple separated in May 2017 and Paige filed for divorce in June 2017. She also sought joint legal custody of their son David and spousal support.

Filmography

Film

Television

Web series

References

External links 

1972 births
Living people
Alumni of Trinity College Dublin
American Roman Catholics
Irish emigrants to the United States
Irish male film actors
Irish male television actors
Irish male voice actors
People educated at St Michael's College, Dublin
People from Sandycove
20th-century Irish male actors
21st-century Irish male actors